The white-crowned sparrow (Zonotrichia leucophrys) is a species of passerine bird native to North America. A medium-sized member of the New World sparrow family, this species is marked by a grey face and black and white streaking on the upper head. It breeds in brushy areas in the taiga and tundra of the northernmost parts of the continent and in the Rocky Mountains and Pacific coast. While southerly populations in the Rocky Mountains and coast are largely resident, the breeding populations of the northerly part of its range are migratory and can be found as wintering or passage visitors through most of North America south to central Mexico.

Etymology

The scientific name is from Ancient Greek.

Description 
Adults have black and white stripes on their head, a gray face, brown streaked upper parts and a long tail. The wings are brown with bars and the underparts are gray. Their bill is pink or yellow. They are similar in appearance to the white-throated sparrow, but do not have the white throat markings or yellow lores.

Measurements:

 Length: 5.9-6.3 in (15-16 cm)
 Weight: 0.9-1.0 oz (25-28 g)
 Wingspan: 8.3-9.4 in (21-24 cm)

Subspecies 

There are five currently recognized subspecies of white-crowned sparrow (pugetensis, gambelii, nuttalli, oriantha, and leucophrys), varying in breeding distribution migratory route. Birds of the subspecies nuttalli are permanent residents in California, while birds of the subspecies gambelli may migrate as far as the Arctic Circle during the summer breeding season. Northern birds migrate to the southern United States and northern Mexico.

Distribution 

Their breeding habitat is brushy areas across northern Canada and the western United States.

The white-crowned sparrow is a very rare vagrant to western Europe. It has been sighted in England, Scotland, Ireland, and Norway. In 2008 a white-crowned sparrow was spotted in Cley next the Sea in Norfolk, England. To commemorate the event an image of the bird was included in a window at St Margaret's Church.

Behaviour 
These birds forage on the ground or in low vegetation, but sometimes make short flights to catch flying insects. They mainly eat seeds, other plant parts and insects. In winter, they often forage in flocks.

White-crowned sparrows nest either low in bushes or on the ground under shrubs and lay three to five brown-marked gray or greenish-blue eggs.

The white-crowned sparrow is known for its unihemispheric slow-wave sleep, which allows it to stay half-awake for up to two weeks during migration. This effect has been studied for possible human alertness applications in shift work and truck driving.

Recent studies by ornithologists including Elizabeth Derryberry have shown that white-crowned sparrow songs are affected by human activity and noise.

Images

References

Further reading 
 Kroodsma DE, Baker MC, Baptista LF & Petrinovich L. (1985). Vocal "dialects" in Nuttall's white-crowned sparrow. In Johnston, R F [Editor] Current Ornithology 103-133, 1985. Plenum Press, 233 Spring Street, New York, New York.

External links 

 White-crowned sparrow species account - Cornell Lab of Ornithology
 White-crowned sparrow - Zonotrichia leucophrys - USGS Patuxent Bird Identification InfoCenter
 
 
 

white-crowned sparrow
Native birds of Alaska
Birds of Canada
Native birds of the Northwestern United States
white-crowned sparrow
Taxa named by Johann Reinhold Forster